Eugène Chanal (28 July 1868, Nantua - 8 March 1951) was a French politician. He belonged to the Radical Party. He was a member of the Chamber of Deputies from 1902 to 1919 and Senator from 1920 to 1940. On 10 July 1940 he voted in favour of granting the Cabinet presided by Marshal Philippe Pétain authority to draw up a new constitution, thereby effectively ending the French Third Republic and establishing Vichy France.

References

1868 births
1951 deaths
People from Nantua
Radical Party (France) politicians
Members of the 8th Chamber of Deputies of the French Third Republic
Members of the 9th Chamber of Deputies of the French Third Republic
Members of the 10th Chamber of Deputies of the French Third Republic
Members of the 11th Chamber of Deputies of the French Third Republic
French Senators of the Third Republic
Senators of Ain